Zhongjie or Middle Street is the traditional shopping street near the Mukden Palace in Shenyang, Liaoning Province, China. It is 1,500 meters long. Part of the street is now a pedestrian zone.

History
The history of Zhongjie goes back to the latter part of the Qing Dynasty, when it was called Siping Street. It was the oldest shopping street in Shenyang. In the renovation project in 1997, Zhongjie became China's first pedestrian zone street.

Transportation
Zhongjie station and Dongzhongjie station on Shenyang Metro Line 1

See also
Shopping streets in Shenyang

References

External links

Middle Street (general shopping) - 中街, zhong jie (in English)

Transport in Shenyang
Tourist attractions in Shenyang